Leroy M. Zimmerman (December 27, 1932 – December 6, 2002), was a Republican member of the Pennsylvania House of Representatives.
He attended Terre Hill High School. He was first elected to represent the 99th legislative district in 1994, a position he held until his death in 2002. In 2005, a four-year-old bridge over the Conestoga River on U.S. Route 322 was renamed in honor of Zimmerman.

References

External links
  official PA House profile (archived)

2002 deaths
Republican Party members of the Pennsylvania House of Representatives
1932 births
20th-century American politicians